Gapel (in German: Gabel) is a small village in Slovakia which was founded in the 18th century. Since 1960 it has been a part of Valaska Bela district. Before this, it was a part of Zliechov district.

In the past, Gapel was famous for its glass industry. However, in the 1950s the glass industry was moved to Valaska Bela. It is because of this fact that these days the village is a favourite for cottagers who spend weekends and holidays there.

Villages in Slovakia